Austin is an English masculine given name, an Old French language contraction of Agustin as Aostin, Austin (regular disappearing of intervocalic [g] from Late Latin to Old French, compare month August : Old French aüst / aoust, French août). Agustin is the popular form of Augustin, equivalent to Augustine. Variations of the name include Austen and Auston.

Notable people with the given name "Austin" include

A
Austin Abrams (born 1996), American actor
Austin Adamec (born 1988), American musician
Austin Adams (disambiguation), multiple people
Austin Adarraga (born 1965), Spanish squash player
Austin Ainge (born 1981), American basketball coach and player
Austin Allen (disambiguation), multiple people
Austin M. Allran (born 1951), American politician
Austin D. Alvord (1843–1924), American politician
Austin Amelio (born 1988), American actor
Austin Amissah (1930–2001), Ghanaian lawyer
Austin Andrews (born 1985), Canadian film editor
Austin App (1902–1984), German-American professor
Austin Appleby (born 1993), American football player
Austin Ardill (1917–2010), Northern Irish politician
Austin Aries (born 1978), American professional wrestler
Austin Armacost (born 1988), American television personality
Austin Arnett (born 1991), American mixed martial artist
Austin Asche (born 1925), Canadian judge
Austin Aune (born 1993), American football player
Austin Austin (1855–1925), Australian politician
Austin Aviza (born 1997), American soccer player

B
Austin Barnes (born 1989), American baseball player
Austin Basis (born 1976), American actor
Austin Bauer (born 1997), Canadian badminton player
Austin Baxter (1931–1993), English cricketer
Austin Bearse (1808–1881), American sea captain
Austin Beck (born 1998), American baseball player
Austin Belknap (1819–1902), American businessman and politician
Austin Letheridge Bender (1916–1980), American politician
Austin Bergner (born 1997), American baseball player
Austin Bernicke (??–1977), Nauran politician
Austin Berry (disambiguation), multiple people
Austin Beutner (born 1960), American businessman
Austin Bibens-Dirkx (born 1985), American baseball player
Austin Bide (1915–2008), British chemist
Austin Bird (1884–1938), English cricketer
Austin Bisnow (born 1987), American musician
Austin Bissell (??–1807), English naval officer
Austin Block (born 1989), American ice hockey player
Austin Blythe (born 1992), American football player
Austin Brady (born 1955), Irish footballer
Austin Brummett (born 2004), American soccer player
Austin Brice (born 1992), American baseball player
Austin Briggs (1908–1973), American cartoonist
Austin Brown (born 1985), American singer-songwriter
Austin Brucklacher (1898–1941), American football player
Austin Brummett (born 2004), American soccer player
Austin R. Brunelli (1907–1989), American army officer
Austin Bryant (born 1996), American football player
Austin Buchanan (born 1984), English rugby league footballer
Austin Bukenya (born 1944), Ugandan poet and novelist
Austin Butler (born 1991), American actor

C
Austin Calitro (born 1994), American football player
Austin Cameron (born 1977), American stock car racing driver
Austin Carlile (born 1987), American singer-songwriter
Austin Carr (disambiguation), multiple people
Austin Carroll (1835–1909), Irish nun
Austin Cassar-Torreggiani (1915–??), Maltese sprinter
Austin Chapman (1864–1926), Australian politician
Austin Chewe, Zambian politician
Austin Chick (born 1971), American film director
Austin Choi-Fitzpatrick, American scholar
Austin Cindric (born 1998), American stock car racing driver
Austin Clapp (1910–1971), American swimmer
Austin Hobart Clark (1880–1954), American zoologist
Austin Clarke (disambiguation), multiple people
Austin Claunch (born 1989), American basketball coach
Austin Claypool (1887–1956), Canadian politician
Austin Coates (1922–1997), British civil servant
Austin Codrington (born 1975), Canadian cricketer
Austin E. Cofrin (1883–1980), American industrialist
Austin Cole (born 1998), Canadian athlete
Austin Collie (born 1985), Canadian-born American football player
Austin Collier (1914–1991), English footballer
Austin Connelly (born 1996), American professional golfer
Austin Cook (born 1991), American professional golfer
Austin Cooper (disambiguation), multiple people
Austin Corbett (born 1995), American football player
Austin Corbin (1827–1896), American entrepreneur
Austin M. Cowan (1885–1949), American judge
Austin Cowles (1792–1872), American religious figure
Austin Craig (1872–1949), American historian
Austin P. Cristy (1850–1926), American publisher
Austin Croshere (born 1975), American basketball player
Austin Crute (born 1995), American actor and singer
Austin Currie (1939–2021), Irish politician
Austin F. Cushman (1830–1914), American inventor
Austin Cutting (born 1996), American football player
Austin Cuvillier (1779–1849), Canadian businessman
Austin Czarnik (born 1992), American ice hockey player

D
Austin Dabney (1765–1830), American slave and militiaman
Austin Dacey (born 1972), American philosopher and activist
Austin da Luz (born 1987), American soccer player
Austin Davis (disambiguation), multiple people
Austin Daye (born 1988), American basketball player
Austin Dean (born 1993), American baseball player
Austin Deasy (1936–2017), Irish politician
Austin Deculus (born 1999), American football player
Austin de Lone (born 1946), American keyboardist
Austin Denham (1850–1948), American sailor
Austin Denney (1944–2009), American football player
Austin Edwin Dewar (1912–1985), Canadian politician
Austin Dias (born 1998), New Zealand rugby league footballer
Austin Dillon (born 1990), American stock car racing driver
Austin Dobson (1912–1963), English racing driver
Austin Dowling (1868–1930), American prelate
Austin Downes (1907–??), American football player
Austin K. Doyle (1898–1970), American naval officer
Austin Thabani Dube (born 1992), South African footballer
Austin Dufault (born 1990), American basketball player
Austin Duke (born 1993), American football player
Austin Dummett (1923–1984), Guyanese cricketer
Austin Duncan-Jones (1908–1967), British philosopher
Austin Cornelius Dunham (1833–1918), American businessman
Austin Dunne (1934–2007), Irish footballer
Austin J. Durney (1867–1926), American sailor

E
Austin Eaton III (born 1969), American golfer
Austin Edwards (born 1997), American football player
Austin Burton Edwards (1909–1960), Australian geologist
Austin Ejide (born 1984), Nigerian footballer
Austin Ekeler (born 1995), American football player
Auston English (born 1987), American football player
Austin Ernst (born 1992), American golfer
Austin W. Erwin (1887–1965), American lawyer and politician
Austin Eubanks (1981–2019), American motivational speaker
Austin Evans (born 1968), Australian politician
Austin Evans (YouTuber) (born 1992), American social media personality

F
Austin Faoliu (born 1999), American football player
Austin Farley (born 1993), American ice hockey player
Austin Farrer (1904–1968), English theologian and philosopher
Austin Fernando, Sri Lankan politician and civil servant
Austin L. Fickling (1914–1997), American judge
Austin Flannery (1925–2008), Dominican priest and editor
Austin Lloyd Fleming (1894–1969), Canadian pilot
Austin Flint I (1812–1886), American physician
Austin Flint II (1836–1915), American physician
Austin Flynn (1933–2021), Irish hurler
Austin E. Ford (1857–1896), American publisher
Austin Fort (born 1995), American football player
Austin Frakt, American economist
Austin Franklin (born 1992), American football player
Austin Levi Fraser (1868–1946), Canadian lawyer and judge
Austin Freeman (born 1989), American basketball player
Austin French (born 1994), American Christian musician
Austin Fyten (born 1991), Canadian ice hockey player

G
Austin Gallagher, American marine biologist
Austin Akufo Gamey (born 1949), Ghanaian politician
Austin B. Garretson (1856–1931), American labor leader
Austin Garvin (1945–2022), Irish Gaelic football manager
Austin Gary (born 1947), American novelist
Austin Gatt (born 1953), Maltese politician
Austin Gibbs (born 1986), American musician
Austin Claude Girdwood (1875–1951), British army officer
Austin Gleeson (born 1995), Irish hurler
Austin Gomber (born 1993), American baseball player
Austin Gough, American football player
Austin Gralton (1871–1919), Australian rugby union footballer
Austin Grossman (born 1969), American author
Austin Guerrero (born 1989), American soccer player
Austin Gunn (born 1994), American professional wrestler
Austin Gunsel (1909–1974), American sports executive

H
Austin Hack (born 1992), American rower
Austin Hall (writer) (1885–1933), American novelist
Austin Hamilton (born 1997), Swedish sprinter
Austin Hamlet (born 1979), Nigerian footballer
Austin Hansen (1910–1996), American photographer
Austin Morris Harmon (1878–1950), American scholar
Austin Harrier (1912–2000), American politician
Austin Harris (born 1995/1996), American politician
Austin Harrison (1873–1928), British journalist
Austin Hays (born 1995), American baseball player
Austin Healey (born 1973), English rugby union player
Austin Hedges (born 1992), American baseball player
Austin Hendrick (born 2001), American baseball player
Austin Herink (born 1995), American football coach
Austin Herzog (born 2002), American racing driver
Austin Higgins (1897–1976), American football player
Austin Hill (born 1994), American stock car racing driver
Austin Bradford Hill (1897–1991), English epidemiologist
Austin Hodson (1879–1961), English bishop
Austin Hogan (1901–1982), Australian rules footballer
Austin Hollins (born 1991), American basketball player 
Austin Holyoake (1826–1874), British publisher
Austin Hooper (born 1994), American football player
Austin Hope (born 1973), American winemaker
Austin Hopkinson (1879–1962), British politician and industrialist
Austin Horan (1869–1925), Australian politician
Austin Howard (born 1987), American football player
Austin Hoyt (1915–1976), American judge
Austin Hubbard (born 1991), American mixed martial artist
Austin Hudson (disambiguation), multiple people
Austin Huggins (born 1970), Kittitian footballer

I
Austin Idol (born 1949), American professional wrestler
Austin Ikenna (born 1993), Nigerian footballer
Austin Ikin (1930–2013), South African rower

J
Austin Jackson (disambiguation), multiple people
Austin Johnson (disambiguation), multiple people
Austin Jones (disambiguation), multiple people

K
Austin Kafentzis (born 1996), American football player
Austin Kalish (1921–2016), American film producer
Austin Kanallakan (born 1991), American figure skater
Austin Katz (born 1999), American swimmer
Austin Kearns (born 1980), American baseball player
Austin Kellogg (1814–1895), American politician
Austin Kelly, Irish musician
Austin Kendall (born 1997), American football player
Austin Kerr (born 1989), American musical artist
Austin King (born 1981), American football coach
Austin Augustus King (1802–1870), American lawyer and politician
Austin H. Kiplinger (1918–2015), American journalist and businessman
Austin Kleba (born 1999), American speed skater
Austin Kleon (born 1983), American author
Austin Knickerbocker (1918–1997), American basketball player
Austin Knight (disambiguation), multiple people
Austin Eldon Knowlton (1909–2003), American architect
Austin Knudsen (born 1980/1981), American politician
Austin Kowal (born 1985), American entrepreneur
Austin Krajicek (born 1990), American tennis player

L
Austin Larkin (born 1995), American football player
Austin E. Lathrop (1865–1950), American politician
Austin Ledbetter (born 1995), American soccer player
Austin Lee (born 1983), American artist
Austin M. Lee (1919–2013), American politician
Austin Leigh, British actor
Austin Leslie (1934–2005), American chef
Austin Lewis (disambiguation), multiple people
Austin Liato (born 1965), Zambian politician
Austin Lin (born 1988), Taiwanese actor
Austin Loughnan (1851–1926), Australian cricketer
Austin Lucas, American indie artist
Austin Luke (born 1994), American basketball player
Austin da Luz (born 1987), American soccer player

M
Austin MacCormick (1893–1979), American criminologist
Austin MacDonald (born 1995), Canadian actor
Austin MacGinnis (born 1995), American football player
Austin Mack (born 1997), American football player
Austin MacPhee (born 1979), Scottish footballer
Austin Madison (born 1984), American animator and actor
Austin Maddox (born 1991), American baseball player
Austin Mahone (born 1996), American singer-songwriter
Austin Makacha (born 1984), Kenyan footballer
Austin Mann (1847–1912), American lawyer and politician
Austin Mardon (born 1962), Canadian author
Austin John Marshall (1937–2013), English record producer
Austin Martin (born 1999), American baseball player
Austin Martz (born 1992), American soccer player
Austin Mast (born 1972), American researcher
Austin Matthews (1904–1997), English cricketer
Auston Matthews (born 1997), American ice hockey player
Austin McCann (born 1980), Scottish footballer
Austin McChord (born 1985), American businessman and engineer
Austin McGary (1846–1928), American evangelist
Austin McGill (born 1935), Scottish footballer
Austin McHenry (1894–1922), American baseball player
Austin McIntosh (born 1987), English footballer
Austin P. McKenzie (born 1993), American actor
Austin Meadows (born 1995), American baseball player
Austin Mecklem (1890–1951), American artist
Austin Meehan (1897–1961), American politician
Austin Meldon (1844–1904), Irish surgeon and writer
Austin Menaul (1888–1975), American track athlete
Austin Miller (disambiguation), multiple people
Austin Mitchell (1934–2021), British politician
Austin Morris (1913–1991), English footballer
Austin Murphy (born 1927), American politician
Austin Murphy (writer) (born 1961), American sports writer
Austin Muwowo (born 1996), Zambian footballer

N
Austin Nichols (born 1980), American actor
Austin Nichols (basketball) (born 1994), American basketball player
Austin Nola (born 1989), American baseball player
Austin Noonan (1933–2022), Irish footballer
Austin North (born 1996), American actor

O
Austin O'Brien (born 1981), American actor and photographer
Austin O'Connor (born 1974), Irish equestrian
Austin O'Malley, Gaelic footballer
Austin O'Malley (author) (1858–1932), English ophthalmologist
Austin Osueke, American comic book artist

P
Austin Pack (born 1994), American soccer player
Austin Pardue (1899–1981), American bishop
Austin Parsons (born 1949), Scottish cricketer
Austin Pasztor (born 1990), Canadian-American football player
Austin H. Patterson, American politician
Austin Pearce (1921–2004), British aerospace engineer
Austin Peay (1876–1927), American politician
Austin Peck (born 1971), American actor
Austin Pelton (1920–2003), Canadian politician
Austin Pendleton (born 1940), American actor
Austin Peralta (1990–2012), American pianist
Austin Petersen (born 1981), American writer
Austin Peterson (1906–2015), American screenwriter
Austin Pettis (born 1989), American football player
Austin F. Pike (1819–1886), American politician
Austin Pitre (1918–1981), American musician
Austin Poganski (born 1996), American ice hockey player
Austin Lane Poole (1889–1963), British mediaevalist 
Austin Post (disambiguation), multiple people
Austin Price (born 1995), American basketball player 
Austin Proehl (born 1995), American football player
Austin Prokop (1921–1980), American fencer
Austin Pruitt (born 1989), American baseball player
Austin Punch (1894–1985), Australian cricketer

Q
Austin E. Quigley (born 1942), American academic administrator
Austin Quinn (1892–1974), Irish prelate
Austin Quinn-Davidson (born 1979), American politician and attorney

R
Austin Ramirez (born 1978), American businessman
Austin Rawlinson (1902–2000), English swimmer
Austin Reaves (born 1998), American basketball player
Austin Reed (disambiguation), multiple people
Austin Rehkow (born 1995), American football player
Austin Reiter (born 1991), American football player
Austin Renforth, American general
Austin Rhodes (1937–2019), English rugby league footballer
Austin Ricci (born 1996), Canadian soccer player
Austin Richards (born 1983), West Indies cricketer
Austin Riley (born 1997), American baseball player
Austin Rivers (born 1992) American basketball player
Austin Robbins (born 1971), American football player
Austin Roberts (disambiguation), multiple people
Austin Robertson (disambiguation), multiple people
Austin Robinson (1897–1993), English economist
Austin Alan Rochez, rapper under the name 645AR
Austin Roe (1748–1830), American spy
Austin Rogers (disambiguation), multiple people
Austin Romine (born 1988), American baseball player
Auston Rotheram (1876–1946), Irish polo player
Austin Rudd (1868–1929), British comedian
Austin Ruse, American conservative political activist
Austin Russell (disambiguation), multiple people

S
Austin Samuels (born 2000), English footballer
Austin Sarat (born 1947), American political scientist and professor
Austin Savage (born 1991), American soccer player
Austin Scaggs, American music critic
Austin Scarlett (born 1983), American fashion designer
Austin Schlottmann (born 1995), American football player
Austin Scott (disambiguation), multiple people
Austin Seferian-Jenkins (born 1992), American football player
Austin Seibert (born 1997), American football player
Austin Wayne Self (born 1996), American professional stock car driver
Austin O. Sexton (1852–1908), American politician
Austin Shaba, Tanzanian politician
Austin Conrad Shafer (1844–1944), American teacher
Austin Shaw, American singer-songwriter
Austin Shepherd (born 1992), American football player
Austin Sherry, Australian rugby league footballer
Austin Shofner (1916–1999), American Marine Corps officer
Austin Slater (born 1992), American baseball player
Austin J. Small (1894–1929), English writer
Austin Smith (disambiguation), multiple people
Austin Osman Spare (1886–1956), English artist and magician
Austin Speight (born 1962), Northern Irish footballer
Austin Sperry (born 1978), American sailor
Austin Spitler (born 1986), American football player
Austin Stack (1879–1929), Irish revolutionary and politician
Austin Leander Staley (1902–1978), American judge
Austin Stark (born 1979), American film producer
Austin Steed (born 1988), American basketball player
Austin Stevens (born 1950), South African photographer
Austin Steward (1793–1869), American abolitionist and author
Austin Stogner (born 2000), American football player
Austin St. John (born 1974), American actor
Austin Stoker (1930–2022), Trinidadian-American actor
Austin Stowell (born 1984), American actor
Austin Strand (born 1997), Canadian ice hockey player
Austin Surhoff (born 1990), American swimmer
Austin Swift (born 1992), American actor

T
Austin Tam-George, South African academic
Austin Tate (born 1951), English academic administrator
Austin Taylor (disambiguation), multiple people
Austin Texas (December 27, 1839), A literal city
Austin Theriault (born 1994), American stock car racing driver
Austin Theory (born 1997), American professional wrestler and bodybuilder
Austin Thomas (1939–2018), Aruban fencer
Austin Tice (born 1981), American journalist and veteran
Austin Tindle (born 1984), American anime voice actor
Austin J. Tobin (1903–1978), American businessman
Austin Trammell (born 1998), American football player
Austin Traylor (born 1993), American football player
Austin Trevor (1897–1978), Northern Irish actor
Austin Trippier (1909–1993), English footballer
Austin Trout (born 1985), American professional boxer
Auston Trusty (born 1998), American soccer player

V
Austin Van Catterton Sr. (1913–1993), American politician
Austin Vanderford (born 1990), American mixed martial artist
Austin Verner (born 1943), English swimmer
Austin Vetter (born 1967), American prelate
Austin Vince (born 1965), American motorcycle rider
Austin Volk (1918–2010), American businessman and politician
Austin Voth (born 1992), American baseball player

W
Austin Wagner (born 1997), Canadian ice hockey player
Austin L. Wahrhaftig (1917–1997), American chemist
Austin Wai (1957–2012), Hong Kong actor and choreographer
Austin Walker (1883–1945), American politician
Austin Walsh (disambiguation), multiple people
Austin Walter (born 1996), American football player
Austin Walton, American sports agent
Austin Warren (disambiguation), multiple people
Austin Washington (born 1985), American soccer player
Austin Watkins (born 1998), American football player
Austin Watson (born 1992), American ice hockey player
Austin Webb, American country music singer
Austin Wells (born 1999), American baseball player
Austin Wentworth (born 1990), American football player
Austin White (born 1959), West Indian cricketer
Austin Wiley (born 1999), American basketball player
Austin Williams (disambiguation), multiple people
Austin Willis (1917–2004), Canadian actor and television host
Austin Willis (American football) (born 1992), American football player
Austin Wilson (born 1992), American baseball player
Austin Eli Wing (1792–1849), American politician
Austin John Winkler (born 1981), American singer-songwriter
Austin Winkley (born 1934), British architect
Austin Wintory (born 1984), American composer
Austin B. Witherbee, American politician
Austin Wonaeamirri (born 1988), Australian rules footballer
Austin Woodbury (1899–1979), Australian philosopher
Austin Woolfolk (1796–1847), American slave trader
Austin Woolrych (1918–2004), English historian
Austin Wormell (born 1998), American soccer player
Austin Wright (disambiguation), multiple people
Austin Wylie (1893–1947), American jazz musician
Austin Wynns (born 1990), American baseball player

Y
Austin Yearwood (born 1994), American soccer player
Austin Young (born 1966), American photographer and filmmaker

Z
Austin Zajur (born 1995), American actor

Fictional characters
Austin Moon, in the television show Austin & Ally
Austin Powers (character), created and portrayed by Mike Myers in films
Austin Reed (Days of Our Lives), character in the soap opera Days of Our Lives
Austin, a main character in The Backyardigans

References

English masculine given names